"DJ Pinocchio" is a song by French virtual singer Pinocchio from his debut album Mon Alboum! (2005). Released as the fifth and last single from that album in June 2006, the song reached number 36 in France.

Track listing

Charts

References 

2005 songs
2006 singles
Pinocchio (singer) songs
EMI Music France singles